Michael John French (born 7 May 1955) is an English retired professional footballer who played as a forward in the Football League for Brentford, Swindon Town, Doncaster Rovers, Aldershot and Rochdale. He later coached in non-League football at Hailsham Town and Eastbourne Borough.

Career statistics

References

External links
 

1955 births
Living people
Sportspeople from Eastbourne
English footballers
Association football forwards
Queens Park Rangers F.C. players
Brentford F.C. players
Swindon Town F.C. players
Doncaster Rovers F.C. players
Aldershot F.C. players
Rochdale A.F.C. players
Lewes F.C. players
English Football League players
England youth international footballers
Hailsham Town F.C. players
Isthmian League players